, or Towako Omameda and Her Three Ex-Husbands, also known by the abbreviation , is a Japanese television drama series. The official English title is My Dear Exes. It stars Takako Matsu as the titular character, a 40-year-old woman who, after three marriages that ended in divorce, is raising her teenage daughter while becoming the head of a construction company. Her attempts to succeed and live a fulfilled life only bring her closer to the antics of her ex-husbands (Ryuhei Matsuda, Akihiro Kakuta, Masaki Okada).

Scripted by Yuji Sakamoto, who previously worked with Matsu and Matsuda on the drama Quartet, Omameda Towako was conceived as a "new kind of romantic comedy" and "chatty drama," where attention would be placed on the fast-flowing dialogue between actors. Upon release, the show received acclaim for its story and performances. Although it received a low average viewership rating of 6.1% upon its initial airing on KTV, a subsequent release on Netflix in Japan gave it a larger audience and success on social media.

Cast

Takako Matsu as Towako Omameda                  
Ryuhei Matsuda as Hassaku Tanaka (Husband 1)
Akihiro Kakuta as Katoro Sato (Husband 2)
Masaki Okada as Shinshin Nakamura (Husband 3)
Hana Toyoshima as Uta Omameda
Ryo Iwamatsu as Ousuke Omameda
Mikako Ichikawa as Kagome Watarai
Shizuka Ichibashi as Sara Mitsuya
Kumi Takiuchi as Mirei Furuki
Natsumi Ichibashi as Tsubasa Kotani
Maryjun Takahashi as Karen Shorin
Yoshimasa Kondo as Jin Rokubo
Joe Odagiri as Hiroshi Takanashi

References

External links

 Official website 

2021 Japanese television series debuts
2021 Japanese television series endings
Television shows written by Yûji Sakamoto
Japanese romance television series
Works about divorce